The Ekolot JK-05L Junior is a Polish ultralight aircraft, designed and produced by Ekolot of Krosno. It was certified in Poland in February 2010. The aircraft is supplied as a kit for amateur construction or as a complete ready-to-fly aircraft.

Design and development
The JK-05L was designed to comply with the Fédération Aéronautique Internationale microlight rules. It features a strut-braced high wing, an enclosed cockpit with two seats in side-by-side configuration, fixed tricycle landing gear and a single engine in tractor configuration.

The aircraft is made from composites. The twin  fuel tanks are located behind the seats. A ballistic parachute is available. The controls include a single, centrally-mounted centre stick and electric trim. The standard engine is the  Rotax 912UL four-stroke powerplant.

The JK-05L was later developed into the Ekolot KR-030 Topaz.

Specifications (JK-05L Junior)

References

External links

2010s Polish ultralight aircraft
Homebuilt aircraft
Single-engined tractor aircraft
Ekolot aircraft